Glioma tumor suppressor candidate region gene 2 protein is a protein that in humans is encoded by the GLTSCR2 gene.

References

Further reading